Dasispermum are a genus of flowering plants in the family Apiaceae, native to coastal area of southern South Africa. Short-lived perennial or annuals, they are low-lying, often sprawling herbs with succulent or semi-succulent leaves, adapted to the dry, salty conditions of the littoral areas where they grow.

Species
Currently accepted species include:
Dasispermum capense (Lam.) Magee & B.-E.van Wyk
Dasispermum grandicarpum Magee & B.-E.van Wyk
Dasispermum hispidum (Thunb.) Magee & B.-E.van Wyk
Dasispermum humile (Meisn.) Magee & B.-E.van Wyk
Dasispermum perennans Magee & B.-E.van Wyk
Dasispermum suffruticosum (P.J.Bergius) B.L.Burtt
Dasispermum tenue (Sond.) Magee & B.-E.van Wyk

References

Apiaceae
Apiaceae genera